Luca Giannone (born 2 July 1989) is an Italian professional footballer who plays for  club Turris.

Club career
On 18 July 2014, Giannone joined Lega Pro club Reggiana on a two-year contract. However, on 24 July 2014 he was signed by Serie B club Bologna. He returned to Reggiana on 9 January 2015, having played eight times in the league (Serie B) for Bologna.

Giannone injured his knee in August 2015. He returned to the squad in late September. On 26 January 2016 he left for Casertana.

On 21 January 2017 was sold to Unicusano Fondi.

On 31 August 2020 he joined Turris, newly promoted into Serie C.

Personal life
Giannone has a son Lucas, born in 2015.

References

External links
 
 

1989 births
Sportspeople from the Province of Naples
Living people
Italian footballers
S.S.C. Napoli players
Calcio Lecco 1912 players
F.C. Matera players
Aurora Pro Patria 1919 players
F.C. Crotone players
Bologna F.C. 1909 players
Pisa S.C. players
U.S. Catanzaro 1929 players
Serie B players
Serie C players
Association football midfielders
Footballers from Campania